Liptovské Beharovce is a village and municipality in Liptovský Mikuláš District in the Žilina Region of northern Slovakia.

History 
In historical records the village was first mentioned in 1295.

Geography 
It has a population of about 60.

External links 
 https://web.archive.org/web/20080111223415/http://www.statistics.sk/mosmis/eng/run.html

Villages and municipalities in Liptovský Mikuláš District